Hole is a Canadian short drama film, directed by Martin Edralin and released in 2014.

The film stars Ken Harrower as Billy, a gay man with arthrogryposis multiplex congenita who is struggling to find physical and sexual intimacy. and Sebastian Deery as Craig, his love interest and support worker.

Accolades
The film won the Canadian Screen Award for Best Live Action Short Drama at the 3rd Canadian Screen Awards, and the award for Best Canadian Short Film at the 205 Inside Out Film and Video Festival.

References

External links
 

2014 short films
2014 LGBT-related films
2014 films
Best Live Action Short Drama Genie and Canadian Screen Award winners
Canadian LGBT-related short films
Films about disability
LGBT-related drama films
2014 drama films
Films directed by Martin Edralin
2010s English-language films
Canadian drama short films
2010s Canadian films